Umm Nahad is a collection of four communities (Numbers: 911, 912, 913 and 914) located 30 km south of Dubai, adjacent to Dubai-Al Ain Highway. As of 2018, the combined population of all four communities of Umm Nahad was 2,343.

Economy
Umm Nahad is known for Camelicious, a camel milk dairy farm which was opened in 2006. The farm is primary economic activity of these communities.

References

Communities in Dubai